Louis de Bourbon (1473 – 1520) styled as the Prince of La Roche-sur-Yon was born in 1473. He was the son of John II, Count of Vendôme and Isabel de Beauveau. He married his cousin, Louise de Bourbon, Duchess of Montpensier, eldest daughter of Gilbert of Bourbon, Count of Montpensier and Clara Gonzaga, on 21 March 1504, by whom he had three children. He died in 1520.

Issue
 Suzanne de Bourbon (1508–1570), married Claude de Rieux, Count of Harcoute and Aumale, by whom she had issue.
 Louis de Bourbon, Duke of Montpensier (10 June 1513- 23 September 1582), married firstly in 1538, Jacqueline de Longwy, Countess of Bar-sur-Seine (died 28 August 1561). His second wife was Catherine de Lorraine.
 Charles de Bourbon, Prince of La Roche sur Yon (1515-1565), married Philippe de Montespédon, Dame de Beaupreau (died 1575), by whom he had two short-lived children: a son, Henri, and a daughter, Jeanne.

Notes

Sources

House of Bourbon
French princes
Dukes of Montpensier
House of Bourbon (France)
1473 births
1520 deaths